Erebus clavifera is a moth of the family Erebidae. It is found in Asia, including China and the Philippines.

References

Moths described in 1913
Erebus (moth)